There are eleven official names of South Africa, one in each of its eleven official languages.  The number is surpassed only by India. These languages include English, Afrikaans, the Nguni languages (Zulu, Xhosa, Ndebele, and Swazi), the Sotho-Tswana languages (Tswana, Sotho, and Pedi), Venda, and Tsonga.

There are smaller but still significant groups of speakers of Khoi-San languages which are not official languages, but are one of the eight unofficially recognised languages. There are even smaller groups of speakers of endangered languages, many of which are from the Khoi-San family, but receive no official status; however, some groups within South Africa are attempting to promote their use and revival. 

The official names are:

And one former name:

South Africa's country code, ZA, is an abbreviation of this former official name, Zuid-Afrika.

See also
 Languages of South Africa

References

Government of South Africa
Geography of South Africa
South Africa-related lists
South Africa
Names of places in Africa